Deltophora typica is a moth of the family Gelechiidae. It is found in south-western Africa, South Africa, Zimbabwe and Mozambique.

The length of the forewings is 4.5-5.5 mm. The forewings are ochreous, with dark brown markings. In southern Africa, adults are on wing year-round. In Nigeria, adults have only been collected in January and October.

References

Moths described in 1979
Deltophora
Taxa named by Klaus Sattler